The 2001–02 Grand Prix of Figure Skating Final was an elite figure skating competition held from December 13 to 16, 2001 at The Aud in Kitchener, Ontario, Canada. Medals were awarded in men's singles, ladies' singles, pair skating, and ice dancing. Unlike most competitions that season, the compulsory dance was not part of the ice dance competition at the Grand Prix Final.

The Grand Prix Final was the culminating event of the ISU Grand Prix of Figure Skating series, which at the time consisted of Skate America, Skate Canada International, Sparkassen Cup on Ice, Trophée Lalique, Cup of Russia, and NHK Trophy competitions. The top six skaters from each discipline competed in the final.

In the 2001–02 season, competitors at the Grand Prix Final performed a short program, followed by two free skating or free dance programs. This was implemented because of television coverage. Ottavio Cinquanta envisioned that the skaters would perform two new free skating programs for the season at the final and this would appeal to and help attract viewers. Instead, most skaters went back to an old free skating program for one of the free skatings. Due to the failure of this plan, the second free skating/dance was eventually removed from the Grand Prix Final.

All the medalists from the men's, ladies, and pairs' events would go on to medal at the 2002 Olympics. Moreover, the men's podium was exactly the same at the final as it was at the Olympics.

Results

Men

Ladies

Pairs

Ice dancing

References

External links
 2001–02 Grand Prix of Figure Skating Final
 Isu.org
 Isu.org
 Isu.org
 Isu.org

2001 in figure skating
2002 in figure skating
Grand Prix of Figure Skating Final
Grand Prix of Figure Skating Final